Inimica vis is a papal encyclical addressed to the Catholic bishops of Italy. It remarked on the multiple condemnations of Freemasonry over the preceding century and a half and concentrated on the local difficulties of the Italian church. It was promulgated by Leo XIII in 1892.

It is viewed as reproving the Italian bishops for an apathetic response to Freemasonry and it complained that some members of the Catholic clergy were co-operating with the Masonic and anticlerical government of Italy. It was seen as the start of Papal "bargaining" with the forces symbolised by Freemasonry, although it has also been noted that Freemasonry was denounced as a "vile sect".

On the same date Inimica vis was promulgated, 18 December 1892, Pope Leo XIII wrote Custodi di quella fede, an encyclical epistle addressed to the Italian people, attacking Freemasonry.

See also 
 Anti-Masonry
 Catholicism and Freemasonry
 Christianity and Freemasonry
 Clarification concerning status of Catholics becoming Freemasons
 List of encyclicals of Pope Leo XIII
 Papal Documents relating to Freemasonry

References

Catholicism and Freemasonry
Freemasonry in Italy
1892 in Christianity
1892 documents
December 1892 events
Encyclicals of Pope Leo XIII